This is a list of anti-discrimination acts (often called discrimination acts or anti-discrimination laws), which are laws designed to prevent discrimination.

Australia 
Anti-discrimination laws in Australia
Age Discrimination Act 2004
Anti-Discrimination Act 1991 (Queensland)
Anti-Discrimination Act 1977 (New South Wales)
Australian Human Rights Commission Act 1986
Charter of Human Rights and Responsibilities Act 2006 (Victoria)
Disability Discrimination Act 1992
Human Rights Act 2004 (Australian Capital Territory)
Racial and Religious Tolerance Act 2001 (Victoria)
Racial Discrimination Act 1975
Sex Discrimination Act 1984

Bolivia 
Law Against Racism and All Forms of Discrimination 2010

Brazil 
Anti-discrimination laws in Brazil

Canada 
 Canadian Charter of Rights and Freedoms 1982
 Canadian Employment Equity Act 1986
 Canadian Human Rights Act 1977
 Ontarians with Disabilities Act 2002
 Quebec Charter of Human Rights and Freedoms 1976
 Canadian Multiculturalism Act 1971
 BC Human Rights Code 1996, first version enacted in 1979
 Bill C-16 Bill C-16 Finalized 2017, this enactment amends the Canadian Human Rights Act to add gender identity and gender expression to the list of prohibited grounds of discrimination.

Full versions of all Canadian statute laws for each province (each province and territory has an additional statute(s) regulating human rights and prohibiting discrimination) can be found at  canlii.org.

Colombia 
 Colombian anti-discrimination act 2011 (act number 9882).

this was due to the big PP of Grahm Hanghoíer 5th

European Union 
 The Fundamental Freedoms
 Charter of Fundamental Rights of the European Union whose Article 21 prohibits all discrimination including on basis of disability, age and sexual orientation
 Directive 76/207/EEC on the implementation of the principle of equal treatment for men and women as regards access to employment, vocational training and promotion, and working conditions
 Directive 2000/43/EC on Anti-discrimination
 Directive 2004/113/EC implementing the principle of equal treatment between men and women in the access to and supply of goods and services
 Directive 2006/54/EC on the implementation of the principle of equal opportunities and equal treatment of men and women in matters of employment and occupation

France 
Edict of Nantes 1598
 1789, Article 1 from Declaration of the Rights of Man and of the Citizen

Germany

Hong Kong 
 Disability Discrimination Ordinance
 Family Status Discrimination Ordinance
 Hong Kong Bill of Rights Ordinance
 Race Discrimination Ordinance
 Sex Discrimination Ordinance

India 
 Article 14, 15, 16, 17 and 18 of Constitution of India
Equal Remuneration Act, 1976 - Guarantees equal pay for equal work to men and women.
Indian Penal Code, 1860 (Section 153 A) - Criminalises the use of language that promotes discrimination or violence against people on the basis of race, caste, sex, place of birth, religion, gender identity, sexual orientation or any other category.
Mental Healthcare Act, 2017 - Prohibits the denial or refusal to access mental healthcare facilities or services for people on the basis of race, caste, religion, place of birth, sex, gender identity, sexual orientation, disability or any other category.
Hindu Succession Act, 1956 - Abolished the "limited owner" status of women who owned property, amended in 2004 to give daughters equal inheritance rights with sons.
Scheduled Caste and Scheduled Tribe (Prevention of Atrocities) Act, 1989 - Specifically deals with all kinds of discrimination and hate crimes on the basis of caste.
Transgender Persons (Protection of Rights) Act, 2019 - Specifically deals with all kinds of discrimination and hate crimes faced by people on the basis of their gender identity and gender expression.
Rights of Persons with Disabilities Act, 2016 - Specifically prohibits discrimination and violence against people with physical and/or mental disabilities.
Human Immunodeficiency Virus and Acquired Immune Deficiency Syndrome (Prevention and Control) Act, 2017 - Prohibits discrimination and propagation of hate against people with HIV.

International
Equality of Treatment (Accident Compensation) Convention, 1925
Convention against Discrimination in Education, 1960
Equality of Treatment (Social Security) Convention, 1962
Convention concerning Migrations in Abusive Conditions and the Promotion of Equality of Opportunity and Treatment of Migrant Workers, 1975
Convention on the Elimination of All Forms of Discrimination against Women, 1979
Convention on the Elimination of All Forms of Racial Discrimination, 1965
Convention on the Rights of Persons with Disabilities, 2006
Discrimination (Employment and Occupation) Convention, 1958
Equal Remuneration Convention, 1951
Protocol 12 to the European Convention on Human Rights, 2000
Directive 76/207/EEC on the implementation of the principle of equal treatment for men and women as regards access to employment, vocational training and promotion, and working conditions
 Directive 2000/43/EC on Anti-discrimination
 Directive 2004/113/EC implementing the principle of equal treatment between men and women in the access to and supply of goods and services
 Directive 2006/54/EC on the implementation of the principle of equal opportunities and equal treatment of men and women in matters of employment and occupation
 Charter of Fundamental Rights of the European Union whose Article 21 prohibits all discrimination including on basis of disability, age and sexual orientation
 Inter-American Convention against Racism, Racial Discrimination and Related Forms of Intolerance, 2013 
 Inter-American Convention against All Forms of Discrimination and Intolerance, 2013

Israel 
Employment (Equal Opportunities) Law, 1988
Prohibition of Discrimination in Products, Services and Entry into Places of Entertainment and Public Places Law, 2000

Netherlands 
Anti-discrimination is enforced by Wetboek van Strafrecht, articles 137c-h, and by the Dutch Constitution Law, article 1

New Zealand 
 New Zealand Bill of Rights Act 1990, section 19
 Human Rights Act 1993

Nigeria 
HIV/AIDS Anti-Discrimination Act 2014. This bill makes it illegal to discriminate against people based on their HIV status.

Poland 
Statute of Kalisz 1264
Warsaw Confederation Act 1573

Russia 
Declaration of the Rights of the Peoples of Russia, 1917

Serbia 
Law on the Prohibition of Discrimination, 2009
Constitution of the Republic Serbia, 2006

South Africa 
Section Nine of the Constitution of South Africa
Employment Equity Act, 1998
Promotion of Equality and Prevention of Unfair Discrimination Act, 2000

United Kingdom 
Disability Discrimination Act 1995
Disability Discrimination Act 2005
Equal Pay Act 1970
Equality Act 2006
Equality Act 2010
Race Relations Act 1965
Race Relations Act 1968 and Race Relations Act 1976 amended by the Race Relations Amendment Act 2000
Representation of the People Act 1918
Representation of the People (Equal Franchise) Act 1928
Sex Discrimination Act 1975, amended by the Sex Discrimination (Election Candidates) Act 2002
See also the Employment Equality Regulations covering sexual orientation, religion or belief and age.

Northern Ireland has a similar pattern of 'separate' equality legislation.

United States 
Age Discrimination Act of 1975
Age Discrimination in Employment Act of 1967
 Alaska's Anti-Discrimination Act of 1945
Americans with Disabilities Act of 1990
 Bostock v. Clayton County –— a landmark United States Supreme Court case in 2020 in which the Court held that Title VII of the Civil Rights Act of 1964 protects employees against discrimination because of their sexual orientation or gender identity
California Fair Employment and Housing Act
Civil Rights Act of 1866
Civil Rights Act of 1871
Civil Rights Act of 1957 
Civil Rights Act of 1964
Civil Rights Act of 1968
Civil Rights Act of 1991
Employment Non-Discrimination Act
Equal Pay Act of 1963
Executive Order 11478
Executive Order 13166 – “Improving Access to Services for Persons with Limited English Proficiency”
Fair Employment Act of 1941
Family & Medical Leave Act of 1993 - enables qualified employees to take prolonged unpaid leave for family and health-related reasons without fear of losing their jobs. For private employers with 15 or more employers
Fourteenth Amendment to the United States Constitution
Fifteenth Amendment to the United States Constitution
Nineteenth Amendment to the United States Constitution
Twenty-fourth Amendment to the United States Constitution
Genetic Information Nondiscrimination Act
Homeless Bill of Rights
Lloyd–La Follette Act (1912)
Lilly Ledbetter Fair Pay Act of 2009
 Malby Law of 1895, New York State
Massachusetts Gender Identity Anti-Discrimination Initiative
New Jersey Anti-Bullying Bill of Rights Act
No-FEAR Act
Voting Rights Act of 1965
Pregnancy Discrimination Act of 1978
Rehabilitation Act of 1973
Civil Rights Restoration Act of 1987

See also
Hate crime
Bill of rights
Bill of Rights 1689
Canadian Charter of Rights and Freedoms
United States Bill of Rights
Civil rights
Discrimination
Equal Rights Amendment

References

External links
Employment Discrimination Laws in California and the United States

Discrimination
Lists of legislation
Equality rights
Lists by country

de:Antidiskriminierungsgesetz